Chahkand (also Romanized as Chāhkand; also known as Chahkandak) is a village in Baqeran Rural District, in the Central District of Birjand County, South Khorasan Province, Iran. At the 2006 census, its population was 898, in 262 families.

References 

Populated places in Birjand County